The Albany Bachelors were a Negro league baseball team based in Albany, New York, one of a number of black teams that started to play in the Northern United States after the American Civil War.

The Albany Bachelors played games beginning in 1866. They also played in 1867.

References

Loverro, Thom. The Encyclopedia of Negro League Baseball. New York:Facts on File, Inc., 2003. .

Negro league baseball teams
Professional baseball teams in New York (state)
Defunct baseball teams in New York (state)
Baseball teams disestablished in 1867
Baseball teams established in 1866
Sports clubs disestablished in 1867